The Autopista AP-1 (also known in Spanish as Autopista del Norte) is a Spanish autopista. It has two separate sections: the first from Burgos to Armiñón, and the second from Etxabarri Ibiña (a hamlet close to Vitoria-Gasteiz) to Eibar. In Eibar, at the Malzaga junction, AP-1 meets Autopista AP-8, which connects with Irun and the French border.

The first section became toll-free in 2018. However, it has kept the AP prefix, usually reserved to tolled motorways.

See also
 Autovía A-1
 Carretera Nacional N-I

References

External links
Autopista AP-1 Concessionaire

Autopistas and autovías in Spain
Transport in Castile and León
Roads in the Basque Country (autonomous community)